Jonathan "Maravilla" Alonso Flete (born 6 September 1990 in Jamao al Norte, Dominican Republic) is a Dominican-Spanish boxer. At the 2012 Summer Olympics, he competed in the Men's light welterweight, but was defeated in the first round.

Professional boxing record

References

1990 births
Living people
People from Espaillat Province
Dominican Republic emigrants to Spain
Naturalised citizens of Spain
Spanish male boxers
Dominican Republic male boxers
Welterweight boxers
Olympic boxers of Spain
Boxers at the 2012 Summer Olympics